Decan can refer to:

 Deçan, a town in Kosovo
 Decan, 36 groups of stars (small constellations) used in Ancient Egyptian, Greek, and Indian astronomy
 Decan (astrology), subdivision of an astrological sign

See also
 Deccan (disambiguation)
 Decane